Henry Shakespear Stephens Salt (20 September 1851 – 19 April 1939) was an English writer and campaigner for social reform in the fields of prisons, schools, economic institutions, and the treatment of animals. He was a noted ethical vegetarian, anti-vivisectionist, socialist, and pacifist, and was well known as a literary critic, biographer, classical scholar and naturalist. It was Salt who first introduced Mohandas Gandhi to the influential works of Henry David Thoreau, and influenced Gandhi's study of vegetarianism. Salt is considered, by some, to be the "father of animal rights," having been one of the first writers to argue explicitly in favour of animal rights, rather than just improvements to animal welfare, in his Animals' Rights: Considered in Relation to Social Progress (1892).

Early life and career

Henry Shakespear Stephens Salt was born in Naini Tal, British India, on 20 September 1851. He was the son of a British Army colonel. In 1852, while he was still an infant, Salt moved with his family to England. He later studied the classical tripos at Eton College and King's College, Cambridge, and graduated with a first-class degree in 1875.

After Cambridge, Salt returned to Eton as an assistant schoolmaster to teach classics. Four years later, in 1879, he married the scholar Catherine (Kate) Leigh Joynes, the daughter of a fellow master at Eton. He remained at Eton until 1884, when, inspired by classic ideals and disgusted by his fellow masters' meat-eating habits and reliance on servants, he and Kate moved to a small cottage at Tilford, Surrey, where they grew their own vegetables and lived very simply, sustained by a small pension Salt had built up. Salt engrossed himself in writing and began work on the pioneering Humanitarian League.

Activism

Writing and influence
During his lifetime Salt wrote almost 40 books. His first, A Plea for Vegetarianism (1886) was published by the Vegetarian Society, and in 1890, he produced an acclaimed biography of philosopher Henry David Thoreau, two interests that later led to a friendship with Mahatma Gandhi. He also wrote, in On Cambrian and Cumbrian Hills (1922), about the need for nature conservation to protect the natural beauty of the British countryside from commercial vandalism.

His circle of friends included many notable figures from late-19th and early-20th century literary and political life, including writers Algernon Charles Swinburne, John Galsworthy, James Leigh Joynes (brother-in-law), Edward Carpenter, Thomas Hardy, Rudyard Kipling, Havelock Ellis, Count Leo Tolstoy, William Morris, Arnold Hills, Peter Kropotkin, Ouida, J. Howard Moore, Ernest Bell, George Bernard Shaw and Robert Cunninghame-Graham, as well as Labour leader James Keir Hardie and Fabian Society co-founders Hubert Bland and Annie Besant.

Humanitarian League

Salt formed the Humanitarian League in 1891. Its objectives included the banning of hunting as a sport (in this respect it can be regarded as a forerunner of the League Against Cruel Sports). In 1914, the League published a whole volume of essays on Killing for Sport, the preface was written by George Bernard Shaw. The book formed in summary form the Humanitarian League's arraignment of blood-sports.

Animal rights
Keith Tester writes that, in 1892, Salt created an "epistemological break," by being the first writer to consider the issue of animal rights explicitly, as opposed to better animal welfare. In Animals' Rights: Considered in Relation to Social Progress, Salt wrote that he wanted to "set the principle of animals' rights on a consistent and intelligible footing, [and] to show that this principle underlies the various efforts of humanitarian reformers ...":

Even the leading advocates of animal rights seem to have shrunk from basing their claim on the only argument which can ultimately be held to be a really sufficient one—the assertion that animals, as well as men, though, of course, to a far less extent than men, are possessed of a distinctive individuality, and, therefore, are in justice entitled to live their lives with a due measure of that 'restricted freedom' to which Herbert Spencer alludes.

He wrote that there is no point in claiming rights for animals if we subordinate their rights to human interests, and he argued against the presumption that a human life necessarily has more value than a nonhuman one:

[The] notion of the life of an animal having 'no moral purpose,' belongs to a class of ideas which cannot possibly be accepted by the advanced humanitarian thought of the present day—it is a purely arbitrary assumption, at variance with our best instincts, at variance with our best science, and absolutely fatal (if the subject be clearly thought out) to any full realization of animals' rights. If we are ever going to do justice to the lower races, we must get rid of the antiquated notion of a 'great gulf' fixed between them and mankind, and must recognize the common bond of humanity that unites all living beings in one universal brotherhood.

Later life and death 

Salt's first wife died in 1919; following this, he closed down the Humanitarian league. Salt married Catherine Mandeville on 25 March 1927. In 1935, he published The Creed of Kinship, in which he critiqued established religions and laid out his own philosophy which he called "The Creed of Kinship"; it demanded the recognition of an evolutionary and biological affinity between humans and other animals.

In 1933, Salt suffered a stroke. He died in Brighton six years later, on 19 April 1939, aged 87; his remains were cremated at Brighton Crematorium.

Legacy 
The first biography of Salt, entitled Salt and His Circle, was published by Stephen Winsten, with a preface by George Bernard Shaw, in 1951. A second biography, Humanitarian Reformer and Man of Letters, was published by George Hendrick, in 1977.

Salt's Animals' Rights was reissued in 1980; in the preface, philosopher Peter Singer described the work as the best book of the 18th- and 19th-centuries on animal rights and praised how Salt anticipated many of the issues in the contemporary animal rights debate.

The Henry S. Salt Society was formed with the intention to celebrate the life and works of Salt. Its website provides information on Salt's life and on his friends and fellow activists.

Selected publications 

A Plea for Vegetarianism (1886)
A Shelley Primer (1887)
Flesh or Fruit? An Essay on Food Reform (1888)
The Life of James Thomson (B.V.) (1889)
Life of Henry David Thoreau (1890)
Animals' Rights: Considered in Relation to Social Progress (1892)
Richard Jefferies: A Study (1894)
Selections from Thoreau (1895)
Percy Bysshe Shelley: Poet and Pioneer (1896)
The Logic of Vegetarianism: Essays and Dialogues (1899)
Richard Jefferies: His Life and His Ideas (1905)
The Faith of Richard Jefferies (1906)
Cambrian and Cumbrian Hills: Pilgrimages to Snowdon and Scafell (1908)
The Humanities of Diet (1914) (two excerpts)
Seventy Years among Savages (1921)
Call of the Wildflower (1922)
The Story of My Cousins (1923)
Homo Rapiens and Other Verses (1926)
Our Vanishing Wildflowers (1928)
Memories of Bygone Eton (1928)
The Heart of Socialism (1928)
Company I Have Kept (1930)
Cum Grano (1931)
The Creed of Kinship (1935)

See also
List of animal rights advocates

References

Further reading
Hendrick, George. Henry Salt: Humanitarian Reformer and Man of Letters (1977)
Hendrick, George and Hendrick, Willene Hendrick. (eds.) The Savour of Salt: A Henry Salt Anthology. Centaur Press, 1989.

External links

 
 
 
 Henry Stephens Salt at Find Old Etonians
 The Books of Henry S. Salt, 1887-1937
 
 Henry S. Salt Society

1851 births
1939 deaths
19th-century biographers
19th-century English male writers
20th-century biographers
20th-century English male writers
Alumni of King's College, Cambridge
Anti-hunting activists
Anti-vivisectionists
British social reformers
British vegetarianism activists
English activists
English animal rights activists
English animal rights scholars
English atheists
English autobiographers
English biographers
English essayists
English humanitarians
English literary critics
English male non-fiction writers
English naturalists
English pacifists
English socialists
Organization founders
People associated with the Vegetarian Society
People from Nainital
People educated at Eton College
Teachers at Eton College